Pam Ann Fletcher (born January 30, 1963) is a former World Cup alpine ski racer from the United States.

Her career was marked by injuries, and the most publicized occurred at the 1988 Winter Olympics in Canada. Just an hour prior to the scheduled start of the women's downhill, Fletcher collided with a course volunteer at the bottom of a warm-up slope at Nakiska and broke her right fibula.

She retired from international competition following the 1989 season with one World Cup victory and two additional podiums.

World Cup results

Race podiums
 1 win - (1 DH) 
 3 podiums - (2 DH, 1 SG)

Season standings

World Championship results

Olympic results

References

External links
 
 Pam Fletcher World Cup standings at the International Ski Federation
 

1963 births
Living people
American female alpine skiers
21st-century American women